Daniel Medina (born 1978) is a Venezuelan artist.
He was one of several artists in the Venezuelan Pavilion at the 2009 Venice Biennale.

References

Venezuelan artists
1978 births
Living people